Mojsije Dečanac ("Mojsije of Dečani";  1536–45) was a printer of srbulje liturgical books and Orthodox hierodeacon.

Biography
Mojsije was born to a Serbian family in Budimlja, part of the Sanjak of Scutari of the Ottoman Empire (modern-day Montenegro). He took monastic vows and was a monk at the monastery of Visoki Dečani (in Kosovo).

In the period of 1536–38 Mojsije was a printer at the Vuković printing house in Venice, Republic of Venice. Besides Mojsije, typographers who worked at the printing house of Vićenco Vuković included also Hieromonk Pahomije, priests Genadije and Teodosije, and laity like Stefan Marinović and Jakov Krajkov.

In 1536 Mojsije printed Zbornik za putnike and in 1537 he participated in printing of the Octoechos. In 1538 Mojsije printed the most luxurious and lengthiest edition of Praznični minej.

When Dimitrije Ljubavić went to Târgoviște in Wallachia he brought with him Mojsije. In 1545 Mojsije, now a hieromonk, printed the first book in Ljubavić's printing house.

Annotations
In Serbian, he is simply known with his monastic rank as "Hierodeacon Mojsije" (јерођакон Мојсије). His name translated into English is "Mojsije of Dečani". He is also scarcely called Mojsije Budimljanin (Мојсије Будимљанин, "Mojsije of Budimlja").

See also
Đurađ Crnojević
Stefan Marinović
Hieromonk Makarije
Hieromonk Mardarije
Hegumen Mardarije
Božidar Vuković
Vićenco Vuković
Hieromonk Pahomije
Trojan Gundulić
Andrija Paltašić
Jakov of Kamena Reka
Bartolomeo Ginammi who followed Zagurović's footsteps reprinting Serbian books.
Dimitrije Ljubavić, Božidar Goraždanin's grandson
Inok Sava
Stefan Paštrović

References

Sources

Further reading
 

16th-century Serbian people
16th-century printers
16th-century Eastern Orthodox Christians
Serbian Orthodox clergy
Serbian printers
Venetian Slavs
Serbs from the Ottoman Empire
16th-century people from the Ottoman Empire